Abalakov is a surname. People with this surname include:

 Alexander Abalakov (born 1959), Russian politician 
 Vitaly Abalakov (1906-1986), Soviet mountaineer
 Yevgeniy Abalakov (1907-1948), Soviet mountaineer, brother of Vitaly

See also
 Abalakov thread, an ice protection device named after Vitaly Abalakov